The terms dance technology and Dance and Technology refer to application of modern information technology in activities related to dance: in dance education, choreography, performance, and research.

Dance education

In education, dance technology includes various advanced media, such as video, interactive computer programs and internet., as well as training in the use of modern technologies for dance creation.

Dance design

Dance recording and computer choreography
One of the earliest uses of computers for dance were carried out in the 1960s at the University of Pittsburgh, where the choreographic process was codified and manipulated by computer, although the results were not published.

In the 1970s there were several attempts to computerize the Labanotation and later the Benesh notation. These attempts naturally evolved into attempts to translate the symbolic notations into computer models of the moving human body and further to computer-assisted creation of choreographies.

Dance performance
Dance technology allows for innovative art forms, such as collaborative network performances and The Dance Technology Project, Atlanta Ballet and Georgia Institute of Technology, with its first performance, "Non Sequitur,? of a ballerina dancing with a computer animated "virtual" dancer was shown on CNN's Future Watch program, May 1994.

Virtual dance allows the exploration of physical and virtual dance and blended realities.  The first ballet company to perform in a virtual environment was Ballet Pixelle.  Inarra Saarinen is the artistic director and choreographer who creates animations, imports them into the virtual reality environment Second Life, and then choreographs using the animations.  The avatar dancers are from all over the globe and are not automated in any way but truly dance with each other and the music.  Her company began in 2006 and is still performing.  Other companies,  ZeroG Skydancers, director DC Spensley (Dancoyote Antonelli), also established in 2006 and also still performing.

Integration of live dance performance with dance environment (sound, lighting) was pioneered by Mark Coniglio, whose 1989 MidiDancer measured the angular change at several joints on the dancer's body and used the measurements to control music.

Artists

 Merce Cunningham
 DC Spensley
 Susan Kozel
 Suguru Goto
 Marlon Barrios Solano
 John D. Mitchell
 Bebe Miller
 Troika Ranch
 Chunky Move
 NobleMotion Dance
 Palindrome
 Jamie Jewett
 Boris Willis
 Julie Cruse
 Arthur Elsenaar
 Ashley Friend
 Johannes Birringer
 Lucia Valentin
 Tim Glenn
 Yacov Sharir
 Nic Sandiland
 Kate Sicchio
 Inarra Saarinen
 Eric Dunlap
 Gibson/Martelli (Igloo)
 Todd Winkler
 Joumana Mourad (IJAD Dance Company)

Research

IDAT
Exploration of innovative approaches to harness modern technologies in dance has been reported at the International Dance and Technology Conference. It was held at the following locations:" Computer Nerds Meet Tutus: A Pas de Deux for Dancers and Technology", The New York Times,  March 3, 1999

The University of Wisconsin, Madison, 1992
Simon Fraser University, British Columbia, Canada, 1993
York University, Toronto, Canada, 1995
Arizona State University in Tempe, Arizona, 1999.

See also
Digital theatre

References

Further readingiDance, by Emily Macel, Dance Magazine'', December 2007.

External links
 Archival footage of a PillowTalk about using modern technology as a medium to transmit modern dance to the public which took place at Jacob's Pillow Dance Festival, 7/23/2011.
Archival footage of Bebe Miller discussing her approach to using Motion Capture technology within her choreography at a PillowTalk at Jacob's Pillow Dance Festival on August 23, 2007.
Archival footage of Philip Szporer and Marlene Millar discussing 3D dance film in PillowTalk: Canadian Dance on Film at Jacob's Pillow, 7/3/2010

Dance research
Technology